Interferon-induced protein with tetratricopeptide repeats 3 is a protein that in humans is encoded by the IFIT3 gene.

References

Further reading